Maria Fyodorovna Andreyeva (Mariya Fyodorovna Andreyeva) was the stage name of Maria Fyodorovna Yurkovskaya (4 July 1868 – 8 December 1953), a Russian/Soviet actress and Bolshevik administrator.

Early life
Her father, Fyodor Alexandrovich Fyodorov-Yurkovsky (1842–1915) was the director of the Alexandrinsky Theatre, and her mother was an actress. She followed into the steps of her parents. After drama school she went to Kazan, aged 18. She married Andrey Zhelyabuzhsky, who was her elder by 18 years. He was controller of the Kursk and Nizhny Novgorod railroads, but was also involved in theatre. The couple had two children, Yuri (1888–1955) and Yekaterina (born 1894). Yuri went on to become a film director.

Early career

After Zhelyabuzhsky received a new post, the family moved to Tiflis, where she had success as an actress. They next moved to Moscow, where Andreyeva worked with Konstantin Stanislavski at the Moscow Art Theatre. She made her Moscow debut on 15 December 1894. She enjoyed great success.

Andreyeva took an interest in Marxist literature and she secretly joined the Russian Social Democratic Labour Party. In 1902, she decided to leave acting. In 1900, she met Maxim Gorky in Sevastopol the first time. In 1903 she became his common-law wife.

Gorky and Andreyeva left Russia in 1906 and traveled around the United States, and then settled in Capri, Italy. While in Capri, Gorky was involved in the Vpered group but Andreyeva fell out with Anna Aleksandrovna Lunacharskaya, wife of Anatoly Lunacharsky and sister of Alexander Bogdanov.

Career in theatrical administration

Already by 1914, she was active in attempts to promote classical theatre to the masses. Only after the October Revolution did these endeavours bear fruits. Between 1918 and 1921, she was Commissar of Theaters and Public Shows in Petrograd. She was instrumental in the establishment of the Bolshoi Drama Theater, which opened in 1919. In January that year, Anatoly Lunacharsky nominated her as his deputy in his role of head of art section of the Narkompros in Petrograd. The Petrograd Soviet refused to confirm her nomination, but Vladimir Lenin intervened in her favor and the appointment went ahead.

In 1920, Lunacharsky offered her the position of head of TEO, the theatre department of Narkompros, in Moscow, but she refused.

Later career
In 1921 she traveled abroad selling antiques and works of art, and from 1922 she represented the Commissariat of Foreign Trade in relation to the film industry, spending some time with the Soviet trade delegation in Berlin. During this period she separated from Gorky. Between 1931 and 1948, she held the post of Director of the House of Scientists in Moscow.

References

1868 births
1953 deaths
20th-century Russian actresses
Communist Party of the Soviet Union members
Russian Social Democratic Labour Party members
Maxim Gorky
Recipients of the Order of Lenin
Recipients of the Order of the Red Banner of Labour
Russian artists' models
Russian stage actresses
Soviet stage actresses
Burials at Novodevichy Cemetery